Al-Burayj or Bureij, lit. 'little tower', was a Palestinian Arab village in the Jerusalem Subdistrict. It was depopulated during the 1948 Arab–Israeli War on October 19, 1948, during the first phase of Operation Ha-Har. The village was located 28.5 km west of Jerusalem.

History

Late Ottoman period
In 1838 el-Bureij was noted as a Muslim village, located in er-Ramleh district.

In 1863 Victor Guérin noted it as a village of 200 inhabitants. The Sheikh's house was described as "fairly large and fairly constructed"; the others, less so. Tobacco plantations were spread around. He also noted large ancient blocks, which, it was said, originated from Kh[irbet] Tibneh, just to the north.

Socin found from an official Ottoman village list from about 1870 that buredsch had a population of 116 in a total of 41 houses, though that population count included men, only. It was further noted that it was located between Mughallis and Saydun. Hartmann found that el-buredsch had 40 houses.

In 1882, the PEF's Survey of Western Palestine (SWP) described El Bureij as: "A small village on high ground, having a high house or tower in the middle, from which it is named."

British Mandate
In the 1922 census of Palestine conducted by the British Mandate authorities, Buraij had a population of 398; all Muslims, increasing in the 1931 census to 621; 7 Christians and 614 Muslims, in a total of 132 houses.

In the 1945 statistics, the village had a population of 720; 10 Christians and 710 Muslims, with a total of 19,080 dunums of land. Of this, 31 dunams were for citrus and bananas, 77 were for irrigable land or plantations, 9,426 for cereals, while 14 dunams were built-up (urban) Arab land.

Al-Burayj's had a mosque named al-'Umari Mosque, and it was also home to a Greek Orthodox monastery.

1948, aftermath
During Operation Ha-Har, between the 19 and 24 October 1948, the Harel Brigade captured several villages, among them Bureij. The villagers fled, or were expelled eastwards.

Following the war, the area was incorporated into the State of Israel. In 1955 the moshav of Sdot Micha was established on land that had belonged to al-Burayj, south of the village site.

Large part of the village land is now a military base called Sdot Micha Airbase, which is inaccessible to the public.

References

Bibliography

External links
Welcome To al-Burayj
al-Burayj, Zochrot
Survey of Western Palestine, Map 16: IAA, Wikimedia commons
Al-Burayi, from the Khalil Sakakini Cultural Center

Arab villages depopulated during the 1948 Arab–Israeli War
District of Jerusalem